The Order of the Renaissance of Oman (Wisam Nahdat Oman) is the third highest order of Oman

History 
The Order of the Renaissance of Oman was instituted in 1972 by Sultan Qaboos in 4 class. He added in 1982 a Special Class, "The Supreme Order of the Renaissance of Oman" ("Wisam Nahdat Oman al-'Ali").

Classes 
The order exists in:
 Special Class: "The Supreme Order of the Renaissance of Oman"
 First Class 
 Second Class
 Third Class
 Fourth Class

Insignia 

The Supreme Order of the Renaissance of Oman has a Collar

The ribbon is:
 for the Special Class, green with red larger stripes and yellow borders
 for 1st to 4th class, white with red and green borders or stripes, number and position depending on the class

Notable recipients 
 Willem-Alexander of the Netherlands, Supreme Order of the Renaissance of Oman

Sources 
 World Medals Index, Oman
 Ribbon bars of Oman - page 1 & page 2

Renaissance of Oman
Renaissance of Oman, Order of the
Awards established in 1972
1972 establishments in Oman